Peter Owen (24 February 1927 – 31 May 2016) was a British publisher, the founder of Peter Owen Publishers.

He was born Peter Offenstadt in Nuremberg in 1927, with rickets, the only child of a German Jewish couple. His mother was Winifred Offenstadt.

He was sent to live with his grandmother in England at the age of five, later to be joined by his parents, who were reluctant to leave Germany.

In 1948, at the age of 21, Owen went into partnership with Neville Armstrong in a publishing enterprise called Peter Neville. This lasted until 1955. He went on to found Peter Owen Publishers in 1951.

He was awarded the OBE for services to literature in 2014.

Owen's funeral instructions included, "no religious crap of any kind".

References

1927 births
2016 deaths
British book publishers (people)
20th-century German Jews
German emigrants to the United Kingdom